Björgvin G. Sigurðsson (born 30 October 1970) is an Icelandic politician, representing the Social Democratic Alliance. He became Iceland's first Minister of Business Affairs when the new ministry was split off from the Ministry of Industry and Commerce on 24 May 2007. On 25 January 2009 Björgvin announced he would be stepping down as Minister effective immediately, firing the head of the Icelandic Financial Supervisory Authority as his last official act. He thus assumed part of the political responsibility for the current financial crisis and the associated protests.  He was a been a member of the Althing (Iceland's parliament) for the South Iceland constituency from 2003 to 2013.

Further reading 

Stormurinn – Björgvin's autobiography

Members of the Althing
Business Affairs ministers of Iceland
Sigurdsson, Bjorgvin Gudni
Sigurdsson, Bjorgvin Gudni
Social Democratic Alliance politicians
Politicians from Reykjavík